Ove Söderström (born March 8, 1939) is a Swedish curler.

Teams

References

External links
 

Living people
1939 births
Swedish male curlers
Swedish curling champions
20th-century Swedish people